Rengali railway station is a railway station on the East Coast Railway network in the state of Odisha, India. It serves Rengali town. Its code is RGL. It has two platforms. Passenger, Express and Superfast trains halt at Rengali railway station.

Major trains

 Dhanbad–Alappuzha Express
 Tapaswini Express
 Samaleshwari Express
 Sambalpur–Varanasi Express
 Ispat Express
 Rourkela–Gunupur Rajya Rani Express
 Rourkela–Bhubaneswar Intercity Express

See also
 Sambalpur district

References

Railway stations in Sambalpur district
Sambalpur railway division